Albert Lane (1873 – 29 December 1950) was an Australian politician. He was a Nationalist Party member of the New South Wales Legislative Assembly for Balmain from 1922 to 1927 and a United Australia Party member of the Australian House of Representatives from 1931 to 1940.

Lane was born in Windsor, New South Wales and moved to Sydney at seventeen, where he became an accountant. He was actively involved in the Methodist church, was a keen temperance campaigner, and helped found and was a long-term council member of the New South Wales Home for Incurables. The 1916 liquor referendum which introduced six o'clock closing of pubs in New South Wales was reportedly "largely due to his efforts" as a temperance campaigner. In 1917 he contested the federal election as the unsuccessful Nationalist candidate for the safe Labor seat of Dalley.

In 1922 he was elected to the New South Wales Legislative Assembly as one of four members for the seat of Balmain, representing the Nationalist Party of Australia. The seat was abolished in 1927, and Lane contested the new single-member seat of Leichhardt, but was defeated.

Lane contested the 1931 federal election as the United Australia Party candidate for Barton, creating history by defeating both the incumbent member for Barton, James Tully, and the member for Martin, John Eldridge, who, as a member of the Lang Labor breakaway party, was attempting to transfer to Barton. Lane held the seat until 1940, when he was defeated by future Labor leader H. V. Evatt.

In December 1941, he was hit by a car in Double Bay and broke both his legs. Lane died at his home at Bexley in December 1950 and was cremated at the Northern Suburbs Crematorium.

References

Nationalist Party of Australia members of the Parliament of New South Wales
United Australia Party members of the Parliament of Australia
Members of the Australian House of Representatives for Barton
Members of the Australian House of Representatives
1873 births
1950 deaths
20th-century Australian politicians
Members of the New South Wales Legislative Council